Evergestis alborivulalis is a species of moth in the family Crambidae. It is found in Spain, Bosnia and Herzegovina, Hungary, Slovakia, Bulgaria, Turkey, Ukraine and Russia. Outside of Europe, it is found in the Asian part of Turkey, the Ural, southern Sibiria, east to the Baikal region. It is found in mountainous regions.

Adults are on wing from April to May.

References

Moths described in 1844
Evergestis
Moths of Europe
Moths of Asia